Park Mun-su (28 October 1691 – 22 May 1756), also known as Bak Munsu, was a Korean government official in the period of King Yeongjo in the Joseon dynasty. He was famous for his lifetime spent protecting the Korean people from corrupt royal officials.

Park passed the state examination in 1723 and later became a secret royal inspector (Amhaengeosa; 暗行御史, 암행어사). He is the most famous secret inspector in the history of Korea, and has become something of a legendary figure, with many legends surrounding his achievements.

Bak was the son of Park Hang-han, and a member of the Goryeong Park clan. His art name was Gieun, his courtesy name was Seongbo, and his posthumous name was Chungheon.

Two portraits of Park Mun-su have been preserved and are in good condition.

Popular culture
 Portrayed by Yoo Jun-sang in the 2002 MBC TV series Inspector Park Moon-soo.
Portrayed by Lee Won-jong in the 2014 SBS TV series Secret Door.
 Portrayed by Kwon Yul in the 2019 SBS TV series Haechi.

References

1691 births
1756 deaths
18th-century Korean poets
Mun